Local elections were held in Valenzuela on May 10, 2010, within the Philippine general election. The voters elected for the elective local posts in the city: the mayor, vice mayor, the two Congressmen, and the councilors, six in each of the city's two legislative districts.

Mayoral and vice mayoral election
Incumbent Sherwin Gatchalian was reelected to his second term as the mayor of Valenzuela City. Eric Martinez won his first term as the vice mayor of the city.

The incumbent mayor Sherwin Gatchalian ran for mayoralty office under the Nationalist People's Coalition (NPC) party with his running mate Eric Martinez. Gatchalian, who is a businessman, was the former representative of the city's first district to Philippine Congress from 2001 before his election in 2004. Martinez was a former member of the city's second district council before his election in vice mayoralty position in 2007.

Pablo Hernandez III, a columnist from the tabloid Bulgar also announced his bid in mayoralty race as an independent candidate. He said that he will run for office as "to provide an alternative to the ruling political group in the city.". Another candidate for the office of the mayor is Manuel "Boy" Carreon, is running under the Lakas-Kampi-CMD party. Carreon was dubbed by the Philippine Daily Inquirer as a "politically unknown" person in political arena.

Another candidate for the vice mayor's office is Marcelino "Mar" Morelos, one of the city's councilors for the first district since 2001. Before entering politics, Morelos was a professional basketball player where he played under the Pop Cola Panthers and San Miguel Beermen teams from 1996–2002. The third candidate for vice mayor is Ignacio "Jun" Santiago, also a member of the city's first district council.

Congressional elections

There were two candidates for the congressman or district representative post of each of the districts of Valenzuela City. The city is divided into two congressional districts: the first district encompasses 23 barangays in the northern portion of the city and the second district which contains 9 barangays.

The incumbent first district representative Rexlon "Rex" Gatchalian running under the Nationalist People's Coalition, the same political party he had during the 2007 election. Gatchalian, a businessman, is the younger brother of the incumbent mayor Sherwin Gatchalian. In 2007, he defeated former mayor Bobbit Carlos in the congressional race, hence making this his first political position ever held. The other candidate for congressman is Atty. Maria Elisa "Leezl" Mendoza, a former government lawyer for the human rights division of the Valenzuela City Hall of Justice and  Chairman of the People's Law Enforcement Board (PLEB). Atty. Leezl Mendoza is also the founder of INTEG with advocacies on renewable energy, land use and stewardship as a way towards food security and economic empowerment.

For the second district, the incumbent representative Magtanggol "Magi" Gunigundo ran under the Lakas-Kampi-CMD party. A lawyer by profession, he became the representative of the former municipality of Valenzuela from 1998–2001. The election of 2007 installed him as the second district representative of the city. Gunigundo's opponent to the race is Carlitos "Sonny" Tiquia, a pastor of the Valenzuela Evangelical Church and a former member of the Valenzuela City council.

Many of the candidates for the city council were previous incumbents. In the first district, this list includes Corazon Cortez, Gerald Esplana, Katherine Pineda, and Ritche Cuadra; Adrian Dapat, Fernando Padrinao, Kate Abigael Galang, Maria Cecilia Mayo, and Shalani Carla Soledad for the second district. Soledad became infamous due to her previous withdrawal of running for Congress under Lakas-Kampi-CMD, where she decided to seek another re-election under Liberal Party instead. This was to support her boyfriend Senator Benigno Aquino III, presidential bet of the Liberal Party.

Poll survey
Based in March 2010 mock polls done by the Pamantasan ng Lungsod ng Valenzuela, the city's state university, and was attended by 1,355 student volunteers, the following candidates garnered the spot:

Election results
The winners of the congressional, mayor and vice mayor seats of Valenzuela City is determined with the highest number of votes received. These positions are voted separately, so there is a possibility that the winning officials came from the same or different political parties.

Mayoral race

Vice mayoral race

Congressional race

First District
Rexlon T. Gatchalian is the incumbent

Second district
Magtanggol Gunigundo II is the incumbent.

Election at the city council
The voters in the city are set to elect six councilors on the district where they are living, hence registered. Candidates are voted separately so there are chances where winning candidates will have unequal number of votes and may come from different political parties.

Summary

First district

|-bgcolor=black
|colspan=5|

Second district

|-bgcolor=black
|colspan=5|

References
 Certified List of Candidates for Congressional and Local Positions For the May 10, 2010 National and Local Elections

2010 Philippine local elections
Elections in Valenzuela, Metro Manila
2010 elections in Metro Manila